is a song recorded by Japanese boy band Arashi. It was released on November 2, 2011, by their record label J Storm. "Meikyū Love Song" was used as the ending theme song to the drama Nazotoki wa Dinner no Ato de starring Arashi member Sho Sakurai. The single debuted at No. 1 on the Oricon weekly charts. According to Oricon, the single sold 614,131 copies and ranked number seven on its list of best-selling singles.

Track listing

References

2011 singles
Arashi songs
Japanese television drama theme songs
Oricon Weekly number-one singles
Billboard Japan Hot 100 number-one singles
2011 songs
J Storm singles